The 1984 Central Fidelity Banks International was a women's tennis tournament played on outdoor hard courts in Richmond, Virginia in the United States that was part of the Ginny Circuit of the 1984 Virginia Slims World Championship Series. The tournament was held from September 24 through September 30, 1984. First-seeded Joanne Russell won the singles title.

This tournament was notable for featuring the longest women's singles match (by time) when Vicki Nelson took 6 hours, 31 minutes to defeat Jean Hepner 6–4, 7–6(13–11) during the tournament's first round. The tiebreaker (1 hour, 47 minutes) featured a 29-minute, 643-shot rally, the longest in professional tennis history.

Finals

Singles
 Joanne Russell defeated  Michaela Washington 6–3, 4–6, 6–2
 It was Russell's 3rd title of the year and the 5th of her career.

Doubles
 Elizabeth Minter /  Joanne Russell defeated  Jennifer Mundel-Reinbold /  Felicia Raschiatore 6–4, 3–6, 7–6
 It was Minter's 2nd title of the year and of her career. It was Russell's 2nd title of the year and the 4th of her career.

References

External links
 ITF tournament edition details

Central Fidelity Banks International
Central Fidelity Banks International
Central Fidelity Banks International
Central Fidelity Banks International
Central Fidelity Banks International